Federal Route 58, or Jalan Batak Rabit-Teluk Intan-Bidor, is a Malaysian federal road in Perak state linking Federal Route 1 at Bidor to Teluk Intan and Federal Route 5.

Route background
The Kilometre Zero of the Federal Route 58 is located at Batak Rabit in Teluk Intan, at its interchange with the Federal Route 5, the main trunk road of the west coast of Peninsular Malaysia.

History
In October 1995, the overhead bridge across the railway near Kampung Baru Bidor Stesen collapsed after a goods train jumped rail and crashed onto the beam supporting the bridge. As a temporary measure, a one-lane Bailey bridge was erected while a permanent concrete bridge was constructed from 1997. The new bridge opened to traffic in March 1998 and the Bailey bridge was dismantled.

In the early days, this route only had two lanes. However, in 1995, the stretch between the traffic lights junction at Teluk Intan town center to the traffic lights junction to Federal Route 109 was upgraded into a four-lane, dual carriageway road. In 2004, the stretch between Federal Route 109 to Selabak Estate was also upgraded into a four-lane, dual carriageway, as was the stretch between the traffic lights junction to Jalan Kampung Banjar and the traffic lights junction at Federal Route 5.

Features

The road is mainly a two-lane road except sections of the road several kilometers from Teluk Intan where it features a 4-lane dual carriageway road.

At most sections, the Federal Route 58 was built under the JKR R5 road standard, allowing maximum speed limit of up to 90 km/h.

There is one alternate route: Bidor Bypass.

List of junctions and towns

References

Malaysian Federal Roads